Max is the surname of:

The Max family of artists
NB: two members of this family were knighted (Ritter is German for "knight"), both by Emperor Franz Joseph of Austria: Emanuel Max in 1876 as Ritter von Wachstein and Gabriel Max in 1900 as Ritter von Max, hence their more complicated surnames. 
 Emanuel Max von Wachstein (1810–1901), German-Czech sculptor, brother of Josef, and uncle of Gabriel
 Gabriel von Max (1840–1915), Austrian painter, son of Josef, and nephew of Emanuel
 Josef Max (1804–1855), German-Czech sculptor, brother of Emanuel, and father of Gabriel

Others
 Adolphe Max (1869–1939), Belgian politician
 Édouard de Max (1869-1924), Romanian-French stage actor and son of Emil Max
 Emil Max (1834-1894), Romanian physician 
 Martin Max (born 1968), German footballer
 Peter Max (born 1937), American artist
 Philipp Max (born 1993), German football and son of Martin Max 
 Tucker Max (born 1975), American author

Fictional characters
 Montana Max, from the animated TV series Tiny Toon Adventures